Garrett M. Fitzgerald (May 21, 1806 - September 24, 1859) was an American politician.

Born in Killarney, Ireland, he emigrated with his family to New York City. In 1841, he moved to Milwaukee County, Wisconsin Territory. He was a deputy sheriff and county treasurer. He served in the Wisconsin Constitutional Conventions of 1846 and 1847–1848. He served in the Wisconsin State Assembly, in 1850, as a Democrat, succeeding John Flynn, Jr. (also a Democrat). He died near Milwaukee, Wisconsin.

Notes

1806 births
1859 deaths
People from Killarney
People from Milwaukee County, Wisconsin
Irish emigrants to the United States (before 1923)
19th-century American politicians
Democratic Party members of the Wisconsin State Assembly